William Brown, DD (b Grantham 23 October  1710 - d Horbling 17 November  1797) was  Archdeacon of Northampton from 1764 until 1797.

Brown was educated at Queens' College, Cambridge and ordained in 1740. He held incumbencies at  Marston Trussell, Etton, Alwalton and Peakirk.

Notes

1710 births
People from Grantham
Alumni of Queens' College, Cambridge
Archdeacons of Northampton
1797 deaths